Dawn Michelle Bennett (born December 13, 1992) is an American voice actress, known for her work on English anime dubs for Funimation and Bang Zoom! Entertainment.

Career
While studying her first semester at Berklee College of Music, Bennett participated in an event in Berklee's Video Game Music Club. With voiceover as an option, she tried it and was later encouraged by the club's president to continue voice acting. Bennett went on to volunteer for engineering students' projects throughout her time in college, and shifted her focus from music to voice acting.

Bennett's first role with Funimation was announced in August 2014, when she joined the English dub cast of Fairy Tail as Frosch.

Filmography

Anime series

Film

Video games

Web series

References

External links
 

1992 births
21st-century American actresses
American actresses of Filipino descent
American video game actresses
American voice actresses
Jewish American actresses
Living people